Moridarow-e Bala (also Romanized as Morīdārow-e Bālā; also known as Morīdārow-e ‘Olyā) is a village in Polan Rural District, Polan District, Chabahar County, Sistan and Baluchestan Province, Iran. At the 2006 census, its population was 137, in 20 families.

References 

Populated places in Chabahar County